Michael of Yugoslavia may refer to:
 Prince Michael of Yugoslavia (born 1985), son of Prince Tomislav of Yugoslavia
 Prince Michael of Yugoslavia (born 1958), son of Prince Alexander of Yugoslavia and grandson of Prince Paul of Yugoslavia